MacKechnie and McKechnie are Irish/Scottish surnames. They are Anglicised forms of the Irish/Scottish Gaelic MacEacharna, meaning "son of Eacharn". The Irish/Scottish Gaelic personal name Eacharn is composed of two elements. The first element, each, means "horse"; the second element, tighearna, means "lord". In Scotland, the Scottish Gaelic MacEacharna has usually been Anglicised as McEachern. The surnames MacKechnie and McKechnie can be represented in Scottish Gaelic by MacEachainn, and MacEacharna. The McKechnies are a Sept of the Macdonalds of Clanranald.

People with the surnames
McKechnie
James McKechnie, Victoria Cross*

Bill McKechnie
Bonnie McKechnie
Brian McKechnie
Donna McKechnie
Elizabeth McKechnie
Fiona Mackechnie
Gilbert McKechnie
Ian McKechnie
James McKechnie
Jimmy McKechnie, Scottish footballer
John McKechnie
John McKechnie (footballer), Scottish footballer
Kai McKechnie
Leigh McKechnie
Licorice McKechnie
Robert McKechnie
Roger Mckechnie
Sheila McKechnie
Shirley McKechnie
Tommy McKechnie
Vera McKechnie
Vivienne McKechnie, poet
Walt McKechnie
William Neil McKechnie
William Sharp McKechnie

References

Mckechnie
Scottish surnames
Patronymic surnames